Titan Dome is a large ice dome on the Antarctic Plateau, trending east–west and rising to 3,100 m between Queen Maud Mountains and the South Pole. The dome was first crossed by the sledge parties of Shackleton, Amundsen, and Scott on their journeys toward the South Pole, and was described as a major snow ridge. It was delineated by the SPRI-NFS-TUD airborne radio-echo sounding program between 1967 and 1979, and named after the Cambridge University (UK) Titan computer, which was used to process all the early radio echo sounding data for this part of Antarctica.

See also
 East Antarctica Ranges

Ice caps of Antarctica
Bodies of ice of the Ross Dependency
Dufek Coast